Gafsa may refer to:
 Gafsa, a city in Tunisia
 Gafsa (wasp), a wasp genus in the family Encyrtidae